The Massachusetts Audubon Society, commonly known as Mass Audubon, founded in 1896 by Harriet Hemenway and Minna B. Hall and headquartered in Lincoln, Massachusetts, is a nonprofit organization dedicated to "protecting the nature of Massachusetts". Mass Audubon is independent of the National Audubon Society (NAS), and was founded earlier than the NAS. Mass Audubon protects more than 38,000 acres of land throughout Massachusetts, saving birds and other wildlife, and making nature accessible to all with its wildlife sanctuaries and 20 nature centers.

History
The Massachusetts Audubon Society was born out of Harriet Hemenway's desire to stop the commercial slaughter of birds for women's ornamental hats. Hemenway and her cousin, Minna Hall, soon enlisted 900 women and formed a partnership with many from Boston's scientific community to form their organization. They named the organization the Massachusetts Audubon Society in honor of the bird painter John James Audubon. In 1905, a national committee of Audubon societies was developed. This committee was vital in passing the Migratory Bird Conservation Act in 1913 and the Migratory Bird Treaty Act of 1918 with Great Britain. The passage of these measures effectively eliminated the commercial plume trade.

Mass Audubon's first wildlife sanctuary, Moose Hill Wildlife Sanctuary in Sharon, Massachusetts, dates back to 1916 when the board accepts an offer of Sharon resident George Field to use his property as a bird sanctuary. Mass Audubon purchased the parcel in 1922.

Wildlife sanctuaries

Mass Audubon's statewide network of more than 100 wildlife sanctuaries welcomes visitors of all ages and is a home for more than 150 endangered and threatened native species. Some of the sanctuaries, as noted below, have staffed nature centers or museums.
Allens Pond Wildlife Sanctuary, Westport,  with nature center
Arcadia Wildlife Sanctuary, Easthampton,  with nature center
Blue Hills Trailside Museum, Milton, small museum and outdoor exhibit area within the  state reservation
Boston Nature Center, Mattapan,  with nature center
Brewster's Woods Wildlife Sanctuary, Concord, 
Broad Meadow Brook Conservation Center and Wildlife Sanctuary, Worcester,  with nature center
Broadmoor Wildlife Sanctuary, Natick,  with nature center
Daniel Webster Wildlife Sanctuary, Marshfield, 
Drumlin Farm Wildlife Sanctuary, Lincoln,  with farm exhibit buildings and nature center
Felix Neck Wildlife Sanctuary, Edgartown,  with nature center
Graves Farm Wildlife Sanctuary, Williamsburg, 
Habitat Education Center and Wildlife Sanctuary, Belmont,  with nature center
High Ledges Wildlife Sanctuary, Shelburne, 
Ipswich River Wildlife Sanctuary, Topsfield,  with nature center
Joppa Flats Education Center, Newburyport,  with nature center
Long Pasture Wildlife Sanctuary, Barnstable,  with nature center
Marblehead Neck Wildlife Sanctuary, Marblehead, 
Moose Hill Wildlife Sanctuary, Sharon,  with nature center
Museum of American Bird Art at Mass Audubon, Canton, 
Nashoba Brook Wildlife Sanctuary, Westford, 
North River Wildlife Sanctuary, Marshfield,  with nature center
Oak Knoll Wildlife Sanctuary, Attleboro,  with nature center
Pleasant Valley Wildlife Sanctuary, Lenox,  with nature center
Richardson Brook Wildlife Sanctuary, Tolland, 
Rutland Brook Wildlife Sanctuary, Petersham, 
Sesachacha Heathlands Wildlife Sanctuary, Nantucket, 
Stony Brook Wildlife Sanctuary, Norfolk,  with nature center
Tidmarsh Wildlife Sanctuary, Plymouth,  with nature center
Wachusett Meadow Wildlife Sanctuary, Princeton,  with nature center
Waseeka Wildlife Sanctuary, Hopkinton, 
Wellfleet Bay Wildlife Sanctuary, Wellfleet,  with nature center
West Mountain Wildlife Sanctuary, Plainfield, 

The following large sanctuaries are on the list noted as "Not Ready for Visitors":
Assonet Cedar Swamp Wildlife Sanctuary, Lakeville, 
Cold Brook Wildlife Sanctuary, Otis, 
Elm Hill Wildlife Sanctuary, North Brookfield, 
Whetstone Wood Wildlife Sanctuary, Wendell,

Camp Wildwood
Camp Wildwood, established in 1950, is the Society's only overnight summer camp, and it is accredited by the American Camp Association. The 159 acre camp is currently located in Rindge, New Hampshire, on Hubbard Pond, bordering 1,494-acre Annett State Forest. This is the camp's third location, which it moved to in 2003 after previously being a boy scout camp called Camp Quinapoxet. The property includes a central shower house, arts and crafts center, 135-seat dining hall, health center, office, camp store, seven cabin sites, an archery range, high and low ropes challenge course, playing field, and several trails and areas of forest and wetland for exploration.

During the summers, Camp Wildwood hosts campers ranging from ages 7 to 17. The programs at the camp include a day camp, a three-day session for campers 7 to 8 years old, one- and two-week sessions for campers ages 9 to 16, one- and two-week off-site Treks for campers ages 14–17, and a several-week long Leadership program (called LIT/LIA, meaning Leaders in Training and Leaders in Action) for campers ages 16 and 17. The camp also hosts several three-day long "Family Camp" sessions throughout the summer for all ages.

Camp Wildwood was originally located at Greenfield State Park in Massachusetts until 2003, when it moved to its current location.

References

External links

 

 
Audubon Society
Audubon Society
Ornithological organizations in the United States
Nature conservation organizations based in the United States
1896 establishments in Massachusetts
Organizations established in 1896
Land trusts in Massachusetts